Serp i Molot is a rural locality (a khutor) in Isimovsky Selsoviet, Kugarchinsky District, Bashkortostan, Russia. The population was 16 as of 2010. There is 1 street.

Geography 
Serp i Molot is located 25 km southwest of Mrakovo (the district's administrative centre) by road. Maloisimovo is the nearest rural locality.

References 

Rural localities in Kugarchinsky District